Bartłomiej Urbański (born 15 May 1998) is a Polish professional footballer who plays as a midfielder for Weszło Warsaw.

Career

In 2017, Urbański signed for Dutch top flight side Willem II, where he said, "the Dutch are very self-centered. It is such disastrous self-exaltation. The entire nation considers itself outstanding. They are tactically and substantively prepared, but the players do not always want to listen to their coaches. It is a Cossack mentality that can help, but also lead to worse roads. There is often a belief that you know everything best on the spot. There is no openness to other paths and ideas."

Before the second half of 2018-19, he signed for Chojniczanka Chojnice in the Polish second division, where he made 1 league appearance and scored 0 goals. On 24 April 2019, Urbański debuted for Chojniczanka Chojnice during a 0-2 loss to Warta Poznań. Before the second half of 2019-20, he signed for Polish third division club Pogoń Siedlce. In 2020, he signed for Pogoń Grodzisk Mazowiecki in the Polish fourth division, helping them earn promotion to the Polish third division.

On 11 July 2022, Urbański joined V liga club Weszło Warsaw.

References

External links
 
 

Living people
1998 births
People from Grójec
Association football midfielders
Polish footballers
Poland youth international footballers
Polonia Warsaw players
Legia Warsaw II players
Chojniczanka Chojnice players
MKP Pogoń Siedlce players
KTS Weszło Warsaw players
Pogoń Grodzisk Mazowiecki players
I liga players
II liga players
III liga players
Polish expatriate footballers
Polish expatriate sportspeople in the Netherlands
Expatriate footballers in the Netherlands